No Place to Go is a 1927 American silent romance film directed by Mervyn LeRoy and starring Mary Astor, Lloyd Hughes and Hallam Cooley.

Plot
A wealthy young woman and a bank clerk elope during a cruise in the South Seas. Their disappearance causes concern, which is apparently justified because the two are attacked by savages on an island before they can marry. Marriage eventually occurs after the two return home, but more problems ensue. The film was based on Richard Connell's story, Isles of Romance, which appeared in the April 12, 1924, issue of The Saturday Evening Post.

Cast
 Mary Astor as Sally Montgomery  
 Lloyd Hughes as Hayden Eaton  
 Hallam Cooley as Ambrose Munn  
 Myrtle Stedman as Mrs. Montgomery  
 Virginia Lee Corbin as Virginia Dare  
 Jed Prouty as Uncle Edgar  
 Russ Powell as Cannibal Chief

Production
In addition to Leroy as director, Henry Hobart was the film's producer. Adelaide Heilbron adapted the story and wrote the screenplay. George Folsey was director of photography. The film was distributed by First National Pictures, Inc.

Status 
As of 2018, one copy of No Place to Go was known to exist. The British Film Institute's archives contained "an original 35mm nitrate print ... in need of restoration".

References

External links

1927 films
1920s romance films
American romance films
Films directed by Mervyn LeRoy
American silent feature films
1920s English-language films
American black-and-white films
1920s American films